FFTF may refer to:

 Fast Flux Test Facility, an American nuclear test reactor
 Fight for the Future, a non-profit advocacy group